The women's pentathlon event at the 1979 Summer Universiade was held at the Estadio Olimpico Universitario in Mexico City on 8 and 9 September 1979. It was the last time that this event was held at the Universiade before being replaced by the heptathlon.

Results

References

Athletics at the 1979 Summer Universiade
1979